Cheryl, occasionally spelt Cheryll, is a female given name common in English-speaking countries.

There are several prevailing theories about its etymology. The most common is that it has Italo-Celtic roots and is an anglicised version of either the French name Cherie (from Latin cara, "beloved"; see also Carissa (name)) or the Welsh name Carys (a cognate of "Cara"), modelled on names such as Meryl and Beryl that were popular during the early decades of the 20th century.

A less popular theory is that the name is Germanic in origin and is a feminine version of the Germanic male name Charles, which means "free man".

Notable people with the first name include:

Cheryl
 Cheryl (singer), formerly known as Cheryl Cole, English singer and television personality
 Cheryl A. M. Anderson, American epidemiologist
 Cheryl Arutt, American actress and psychologist 
 Cheryl Baker, British television presenter and former musician
 Cheryl Barker, Australian operatic soprano 
 Cheryl Bentov, Israeli Mossad agent
 Cheryl Burke, professional dancer
 Cheryl Campbell, British actress
 Cheryl Carolus, South African politician
 Cheryl Casone, American journalist
 Cheryl Chase (activist), American intersex activist
 Cheryl Chase (actress), American voice actress
 Cheryl Chase (politician) , American politician
 Cheryl Chin, Singaporean-American actress
 Cheryl Crane, daughter of actress Lana Turner who was tried for the murder of her mother boyfriend
 Cheryl Fergison, British actress
 Cheryl Ford, American basketball player
 Cheryl J. Franklin, American writer
 Cheryl Gallant, Canadian politician
 Cheryl Gamble Clemons, American singer, known as Coko
 Cheryl Gillan, British politician
 Cheryl A. Gray Evans, Louisiana politician
 Cheryl Hall, British actress
 Cheryl Hickey, Canadian TV presenter
 Cheryl Hines, American actress
 Cheryl Holdridge, American actress
 Cheryl Hole, British drag queen
 Cheryl James, American rapper, known as Salt
 Cheryl Keeton, U.S. lawyer and murder victim
 Cheryl Kennedy, English actress
 Cheryl Kernot, Australian politician
 Cheryl Ladd, American actress and singer
 Cheryl Lynn, American singer
 Cheryl L. McAfee (born c. 1958), African American architect
 Cheryl Gates McFadden, American actress and choreographer
 Cheryl Miller, American basketball player
 Cheryl Miller (actress), American actress
 Cheryl Perera, Sri Lankan Canadian children's rights activist
 Cheryl Rixon, Australian actor and model
 Cheryl Rubenberg, American researcher
 Cheryl J. Sanders, African-American womanist scholar and ethicist
 Cheryl Stone, South African-born co-founder of Bangarra Dance Theatre, an Indigenous dance company in Australia
 Cheryl Strayed, American author
 Cheryl Studer, American operatic soprano
 Cheryl Tiegs, American model
 Cheryl Valentine, Scottish field hockey midfielder
 Cheryl West, American playwright
 Cheryl Wheeler, American singer

Cheryll
 Cheryll Greene (1943–2013), American editor and scholar
 Cheryll Heinze (1946–2012), American politician, Republican member of the Alaska House of Representatives 
 Cheryll Toney Holley, American historian and chief of the Nipmuc Nation
 Cheryll Sotheran (1945–2017), New Zealand museum professional
 Cheryll Tickle (born 1945), British scientist

Fictional characters
 Cheryl Blossom, Archie Comics character

See also
Sheryl

References

English feminine given names
Scottish feminine given names
Welsh feminine given names